Q11 may refer to:
 Q11 (New York City bus)
 , a survey ship of the Argentine Navy
 DZOE-TV, formerly Q-11
 , an armed yacht of the Royal Canadian Navy
 Hud (surah), of the Quran
 Motorola Q11, a Motorola smartphone